Ankhwennefer may refer to:

 Ankhwennefer (pharaoh)
 Ankhwennefer (vizier)